H. indicus may refer to:
 Harpalus indicus, a species of ground beetle
 Heliophorus indicus, the Indian purple sapphire, a species of small butterfly
 Hemidesmus indicus, the Indian sarsaparilla, a plant species found in South Asia
 Hoplolaimus indicus, a plant pathogenic nematode species
 Hyagnis indicus, a species of longhorn beetle

Synonyms 
 Heterorhabditis indicus, a synonym for Heterorhabditis indica, an insect pathogenic nematode species
 Helianthus indicus, a synonym for Helianthus annuus, the common sunflower
 Hepialus indicus, a synonym for Hepialiscus nepalensis, a species of ghost moth

See also 
 Indicus (disambiguation)